Park Yong-Ji (born 9 October 1992) is a South Korean footballer who plays as forward for Seongnam FC.

Career
He joined Ulsan Hyundai from Chung-Ang University on 18 December 2012. He joined Busan in the summer of 2014 in part-exchange along with Kim Yong-Tae, with Yang Dong-Hyun moving in the opposite direction. He scored his first goal for the club on 6 August in a 1–1 draw with Gyeongnam.

Club career statistics

References

External links 

1992 births
Living people
Association football forwards
South Korean footballers
Ulsan Hyundai FC players
Busan IPark players
Seongnam FC players
Incheon United FC players
Gimcheon Sangmu FC players
K League 1 players
Chung-Ang University alumni
Footballers from Seoul